Huston is an unincorporated community in Canyon County, Idaho, United States. Huston has a post office with ZIP code 83630.

History 
In 1911, Ben Huston homesteaded 40 acres and he used 10 acres for the townsite.

Huston's population was estimated at 50 in 1960.

In 2005, Deer Flat Merc, the last business closed.

Huston's name was used during the filming of Superman II (1980).

Notable people 
 Connie Hill, postmaster of Huston.
 Ben Huston, homesteader.

References

Unincorporated communities in Canyon County, Idaho
Unincorporated communities in Idaho
Boise metropolitan area